Saint Matthew's Township (also designated Township 17) is one of twenty townships within Wake County, North Carolina, United States. As of the 2010 census, Saint Matthew's Township had a population of 65,731, a 47.3% increase over 2000.

Saint Matthew's Township, occupying  in east-central Wake County, includes portions of the city of Raleigh and the entirety of the town of Knightdale.

References

Townships in Wake County, North Carolina
Townships in North Carolina